Only the Generals, Pt. II is the seventeenth mixtape by American rapper Kevin Gates. It was released on February 19, 2021, via Bread Winners Association and Atlantic Records Group, as a surprise mixtape. This project serves as a sequel to his 2019 EP Only the Generals Gon Understand.

Promotion

Singles 
"Plug Daughter 2" was released as the mixtape's only single on February 12, 2021, as well as an accompanying music video. The song was produced by Rio Leyva, the Internet Money producer Taz Taylor, and Zay. The song did not enter the Billboard Hot 100, but peaked at number three on the Bubbling Under Hot 100 chart. And the song also peaked at number 39 on the Hot R&B/Hip-Hop Songs chart.

Music videos 
The music video for the song "Puerto Rico Luv", was released on February 19, 2021, after the mixtape was released.

Commercial performance 
On March 6, 2021, On the Generals, Pt. II debuted at number 18 on the US Billboard 200, earning 22,000 album-equivalent units, which included 2,000 copies sold in its first week. The project also debuted at number 11 on the US Top R&B/Hip-Hop Albums charts. And the project debuted at number nine on the US Top Rap Albums charts, becoming Kevin Gates' tenth top-10 debut on the chart overall.

Track listing 
Credits adapted from Genius, Spotify, and Tidal.

Notes
  signifies a co-producer

Charts

References 

2021 albums
Albums produced by Taz Taylor (record producer)
Kevin Gates albums
Hip hop albums by American artists
Trap music albums